Fawfieldhead is a civil parish in Staffordshire, England.  It is situated north-east of Leek and south of Buxton, in the Peak District National Park.

See also
Listed buildings in Fawfieldhead

Civil parishes in Staffordshire
Towns and villages of the Peak District